Maikol Duvan Vivas Ramírez (born 28 June 1990) is a Venezuelan footballer who plays as a defender for Ureña F.C.

Personal life
In 2018, Vivas was kidnapped in Ureña and taken to the Colombian border. He was rescued shortly thereafter.

References

External links
Profile at ESPN FC

1990 births
Living people
Venezuelan Primera División players
Venezuelan footballers
Association football defenders
Kidnapped Venezuelan people